Stung Treng municipality is a municipality located in Stung Treng province, in north-east Cambodia. According to the 2019 census of Cambodia, it had a population of 37,103. The provincial capital Stung Treng town is located within the municipality.

Administration
The following table shows the villages of Stung Treng municipality by commune.

References 

Districts of Stung Treng province